Abell 665 is a galaxy cluster in the Abell catalogue in the constellation Ursa Major. It is also known as the only cluster in his 1989 catalog to receive Abell's highest richness class of 5. This means that it contains at least 300 galaxies in the magnitude range of m3 to m3+2, where m3 is the magnitude of the third-brightest member of the cluster. The clusters in all other richness classes contain less than 300 such galaxies. Abell 665's combination of high brightness and large distance, made it an excellent candidate along with 37 other clusters to help determine the Hubble constant using the Sunyaev–Zel'dovich effect in 2006.

Member velocity, cluster velocity dispersion, and X-ray data suggest that Abell 665 is composed of two similar-mass clusters which are at or very close to core crossing, give or take ≲ 0.5 gigayears.

Gallery

See also
 List of Abell clusters

References

0665
Galaxy clusters
Abell richness class 5